The Wanapum tribe of Native Americans formerly lived along the Columbia River from above Priest Rapids down to the mouth of the Snake River in what is now the US state of Washington. About 60 Wanapum still live near the present day site of Priest Rapids Dam. The name "Wanapum" is from the Sahaptin wánapam, meaning "river people", from wána, "river", and -pam, "people". Today they are enrolled in the federally recognized Confederated Tribes and Bands of the Yakama Nation.

History
In prehistoric times, the tribe's territory was (and still is) an excellent salmon-fishing area. It is unknown which tribes were overthrown by the Wanapum tribe when they claimed their ancestral land, or what happened to the original settlers that migrated from NE Asia centuries before the Wanapum and other tribes finally settled in the area.  Because of the lost primitive and scarce archeology of the region, these secrets may never be known, and those people never acknowledged.

The tribe made houses from tule and cut over 300 petroglyphs into the basalt cliffs.
In 1805, according to the journals of the Lewis and Clark Expedition, the Wanapum, led by their chief Cutssahnem, greeted the expedition and treated its members well, sharing food and entertainment. Captain Clark’s journals provide descriptions of their dwellings, clothing, and physical characteristics.

In the 1800s, a new Native religion, called Washane, Washani or "Dreamer Religion", was created by a spiritual leader of the Wanapum named Smohalla.  Adherents to this religion believed that the white man would disappear, if rituals and traditional life was adhered to; instead of participating in armed conflicts, the people prayed. Whether due to this religion or for other reasons, the tribe never fought white settlers, did not sign a treaty with them, and as a result retained no federally recognized land rights.

In 1953 the construction of the Priest Rapids Dam and the Wanapum Dam flooded the riverbanks where the Wanapum had lived in traditional tule houses.

Heritage
About 60 Wanapum petroglyphs were blasted from the rock before being flooded; they may be viewed at Ginkgo Petrified Forest State Park.

A Wanapum Heritage Center Museum displays artifacts of the time before the dams, while the Wanapum River Patrol keeps watch over the ancestral lands, monitoring locations of special significance to the Wanapum to protect those places from depredation, and also providing information to visitors.

The Washane religion is still practiced by some members of other tribes.

Notes 

Native American tribes in Washington (state)
Indigenous peoples of the Northwest Plateau